The Max Planck Institute for Extraterrestrial Physics is a Max Planck Institute, located in Garching, near Munich, Germany.
In 1991 the Max Planck Institute for Physics and Astrophysics split up into the Max Planck Institute for Extraterrestrial Physics, the Max Planck Institute for Physics and the Max Planck Institute for Astrophysics. The Max Planck Institute for Extraterrestrial Physics was founded as sub-institute in 1963. The
scientific activities of the institute are mostly devoted to astrophysics with telescopes orbiting in space. A large amount of the resources
are spent for studying black holes in the galaxy and in the remote universe.

History 

The Max-Planck-Institute for extraterrestrial physics (MPE) was preceded by the department for extraterrestrial physics in the Max-Planck-Institute for physics and astrophysics. This department was established by Professor Reimar Lüst on October 23, 1961. A Max-Planck Senate resolution transformed this department into a sub-institute of the Max-Planck-Institute for Physics and Astrophysics on May 15, 1963. Professor Lüst was appointed director of the institute. Another Senate resolution on March 8, 1991, finally established MPE as an autonomous institute within the Max-Planck-Gesellschaft. It is dedicated to the experimental and theoretical exploration of the space outside of earth as well as astrophysical phenomena.

Timeline 
Major events in the history of the institute include:
 1961 Foundation of working group Lüst
 1963 Foundation as a sub-institute within the MPI für Physik und Astrophysik; director R. Lüst;  Institute moves to Garching (barrack X1)
 1964 Partial move from barrack (X1) to MPE building (X2) in February
 1965 Official inauguration of the MPE main building (X2) on February 15, 1965
 1966 Klaus Pinkau becomes scientific member (cosmic rays, gamma-astronomy)
 1969 Klaus Pinkau becomes director at the institute, Gerhard Haerendel becomes scientific member (plasma physics)
 1972 Gerhard Haerendel becomes director at the institute; reimar Lüst is elected president of the MPG (on leave from the institute),  Klaus Pinkau becomes acting director
 1975 Joachim Trümper becomes director and scientific member at the institute (X-ray astronomy)
 1981 Founded by J. Trümper, the MPE X-ray test facility "Panter" located in Neuried starts operation
 1981 Klaus Pinkau on leave and becomes director at the IPP; Gamma-astronomy is carried on by Volker Schönfelder
 1985 Gregor Morfill becomes director and scientific member at the institute (theory)
 1986 Reinhard Genzel becomes director and scientific member at the institute (infrared astronomy)
 1991 Transformation of the MPI for Extraterrestrial Physics into an autonomous institute
 1990 Joachim Trümper together with the MPI for Physics (MPP) founds the semiconductor laboratory as a joint project between the MPE and the MPP (since 2012 operated by the MPG)
 1998 September: Start of construction work for the expansion building X5
 2000 R. Genzel together with the University of California Berkeley founds the "UCB-MPG Center for International Exchange in Astrophysics and Space Science"
 2000 G. Morfill together with the IPP founds the "Center for Interdisciplinary Plasma Science" (CIPS) (until 2004)
 2000 December: official opening of the expansion building X5
 2001 The "International Max-Planck- Research School on Astrophysics" (IMPRS) is opened by MPE, MPA, ESO, MPP and the universities of Munich
 2001 Joachim Trümper retires; Gerhard Haerendel retires and joins the International University Bremen as vice president; Günther Hasinger becomes scientific member and director at the institute (X-ray astronomy)
 2002 Ralf Bender becomes scientific member and director at the institute (optical and interpretative astronomy)
 2008 Günther Hasinger leaves MPE and becomes scientific director at the IPP. The former independent X-ray and Gamma-ray departments are merged into the new high-energy astrophysics department.
 2010 Kirpal Nandra becomes scientific member and director at the institute (high-energy astrophysics)
 2013 Gregor Morfill retires, part of his plasma crystal group moves to DLR
 2014 Paola Caselli becomes scientific member and director at the institute (Center for Astrochemical Studies)

Detailed history 
The Max-Planck-Institut für extraterrestrische Physik (MPE) was preceded by the department for extraterrestrial Physics in the Max-Planck-Institut für Physik und Astrophysik. This department was established by Professor Reimar Lüst on October 23, 1961. A Max-Planck Senate resolution transformed this department into a sub-institute of the Max-Planck-Institut für Physik und Astrophysik on May 15, 1963. Professor Lüst was appointed director of the institute. Another Senate resolution on March 8, 1991, finally established MPE as an autonomous institute within the Max-Planck-Gesellschaft. It is dedicated to the experimental and theoretical exploration of the space outside of earth as well as astrophysical phenomena. A continuous reorientation to new, promising fields of research and the appointment of new members ensures steady advancement.

Among the 29 employees of the Institute when it was founded in 1963 were 9 scientists and 1 Ph.D. student. Twelve years later in 1975 the number of employees had grown to 180 with 55 scientists and 13 Ph.D. students, and today (status 2015) there are some 400 staff (130 scientists and 75 PhD students). It is noteworthy that permanent positions at the institute have not increased since 1973 - despite its celebrated scientific achievements. The increasingly complex tasks and international obligations have been mainly maintained by staff members with positions having limited duration and funded by external organizations.

Because the institute has assumed a leading position in astronomy internationally, it has attracted guest scientists throughout the world. The number of long-term guests increased from 12 in 1974 to a maximum of 72 in 2000. In recent years MPE has hosted an average of about 50 guest scientists each year.

During the early years, the scientific work at the Institute concentrated on the investigation of extraterrestrial plasmas and the magnetosphere of the earth. This work was performed with measurements of particles and electromagnetic fields as well as a specially developed ion-cloud technique using sounding rockets.

Another field of research also became important: astrophysical observations of electromagnetic radiation which could not be observed from the surface of the earth because the wavelengths are such that the radiation is absorbed by the earth's atmosphere. These observations and inferences therefrom are the subject matter of infra-red astronomy as well as X-ray- and gamma-ray-astronomy. In addition to more than 100 rockets, an increasing number of high-altitude balloons (up to now more than 50; e.g.  HEXE) have been used to carry experiments to high altitudes.

Since the 1990s, satellites have become the preferred observation platforms because of their favorable observation-time/cost ratio. Nevertheless, high-flying observation airplanes and ground-based telescopes are also used to obtain data, especially for optical and near-infrared observations.

New observation techniques using satellites has necessitated the recording, processing and accessible storage of high data fluxes over long periods of time. This demanding task is performed by a data processing group, which has grown quickly in the last decade. Special data centers were established for the large satellite projects.

Besides the many successes, there have also been disappointments. The malfunctioning of the Ariane carrier rockets on test launches in 1980 and 1996 were particularly bitter setbacks. The satellite  "Firewheel", in which many members of the Institute had invested years of work, was lost on May 23, 1980, because of a burning instability in the first stage of the launch rocket. The same fate was to overtake the four satellites of the CLUSTER-Mission on June 4, 1996, when the first Ariane 5 was launched. This time the disaster was attributed to an error in the rocket's software. The most recent loss was "ABRIXAS", an X-ray satellite built by industry under the leadership of MPE. After few hours in orbit, a malfunction of the power system caused the total loss of the satellite.

Over the years, however, the history of MPE is primarily a story of scientific successes.

Selected achievements 

 Exploration of the Ionosphere and Magnetosphere by means of ion clouds (1963–1985)
 The first map of the galactic gamma-ray emission ( > 70 MeV) as measured with the satellite COS-B (1978)
 Measurement of the magnetic field of the neutron star Her-X1 using the cyclotron line emission (balloon experiments 1978)
 Experimental proof of the reconnection process (1979)
 The artificial comet (AMPTE 1984/85)
 Numerical simulation of a collision-free shock wave (1990)
 The first map of the X-ray sky as measured with the imaging X-ray telescope on board the ROSAT satellite (1993)
 First gamma-ray sky map in the energy range 3 to 10 MeV as measured with the imaging Compton telescope COMPTEL on board CGRO (1994)
 The plasma-crystal experiment and its successors on the International Space Station (1996–2013)
 The measurement of the element- and isotope-composition of the solar wind by the CELIAS experiment on board the SOHO satellite (1996)
 The first detection of water-molecule lines in an expanding shell of a star using the Fabry-Perot spectrometer on board the ISO satellite (1996)
 First detection of X-ray emission from comets and planets (1996, 2001)
 Determining the energy source for ultraluminous infrared galaxies with the satellite ISO (1998)
 Detection of gamma-ray line emission (44Ti) from supernova remnants (1998)
 Deep observations of the extragalactic X-ray sky with ROSAT, XMM-Newton and Chandra and resolving the background radiation into individual sources (since 1998)
 Confirmation that a supermassive black hole resides at the centre of our galaxy (2002)
 Detection of a binary active galactic nucleus in X-rays (2003)
 Reconstruction of the evolution history of stars in elliptical galaxies (2005)
 Stellar disks rotating around the black hole in the Andromeda galaxy (2005)
 Determining the gas content of normal galaxies in the early universe (since 2010)
 Resolving the cosmic infrared background into individual galaxies with Herschel (2011)

Scientific work 

The institute was founded in 1963 as a sub-institute of the Max-Planck-Institut für Physik und Astrophysik and established as an independent institute in 1991.
Its main research topics are astronomical observations in spectral regions which are only accessible from space because of the absorbing effects of the Earth's atmosphere, but also instruments on ground-based observatories are used whenever possible.
Scientific work is done in four major research areas that are supervised by one of the directors, respectively: optical and interpretative astronomy (Bender), infrared and sub-millimeter/millimeter astronomy (Genzel), high-energy astrophysics (Nandra), and in the Centre for Astrochemical Studies (Caselli). Within these areas scientists lead individual experiments and research projects organised in about 25 project teams. The research topics pursued at MPE range from the physics of cosmic plasmas and of stars to the physics and chemistry of interstellar matter, from star formation and nucleosynthesis to extragalactic astrophysics and cosmology.

Many experiments of the Max-Planck-Institut für extraterrestrische Physik (MPE) have to be carried out above the dense Earth's atmosphere using aircraft, rockets, satellites and space probes. In the early days experiments were also flown on balloons. To run advanced extraterrestrial physics and state-of-the-art experimental astrophysics, the institute continues to develop high-tech instrumentation in-house. This includes detectors, spectrometers, and cameras as well as telescopes and complete payloads (e.g. ROSAT and eROSITA) and even entire satellites (as in case of AMPTE and EQUATOR-S). For this purpose the technical and engineering departments are of particular importance for the institute's research work.

Observers and experimenters perform their research work at the institute in close contact with each other. Their interaction while interpreting observations and propounding new hypotheses underlies the successful progress of the institute's research projects.

At the end of the year 2009 a total of 487 employees were working at the institute, numbering among them 75 scientist, 95 junior scientists (45 IMPRS PhD students included), 97 externally funded positions and 64 visiting scientists and interns.

The MPE is also active in scientific and vocational training. At the end of 2009 6 students were working on their diploma thesis and 9 apprentices worked in the administration (1) and the institute's workshop (8).

Projects 

Scientific projects at the MPE are often the efforts of the different research departments to build, maintain, and use experiments and facilities which are needed by the many different scientific research interest at the institute. Apart from hardware projects, there are also projects that use archival data and are not necessarily connected to a new instrument.
The following list is not complete, but it is updated regularly.

Active projects 

 ACE
 ARGOS
 Chandra
 CLUSTER
 CONICA (NACO)
 ERIS
 eROSITA
 Fermi (GLAST)
 GRAVITY
 GROND
 HETDEX
 INTEGRAL
 KMOS
 LUCI (LBT)
 MICADO
 OmegaCAM
 OPTIMA
 Pan-STARRS
 PARSEC
 Rosetta
 SOHO
 SPIFFI
 STEREO
 Swift
 Wendelstein
 XMM-Newton

Past projects 

 Abrixas
 ALFA
 AMPTE
 Azur
 Compton GRO
 Cos B
 Equator-S
 EXOSAT
 Firewheel
 GeAs detectors
 HASTA
 Herschel (FIRST)
 Helios
 HEXE
 ISO
 LISA
 MEGA
 Mir-HEXE
 PKE-Nefedov 
 PK-3 Plus 
 PK-4 
 Plasma Lab
 ROSAT
 Sampex
 SMM
 SOFIA
 Stardust
 Ulysses

Future projects 

Under construction:
 EUCLID, a near-infrared space telescope

Proposed projects:

 Athena, an X-ray observatory

Expansion Building 

In the autumn of 2000 the new building was finished and occupied after a construction time of slightly over two years. Besides the office and laboratory space there is also a large seminar room with a capacity of approximately 200 people, and several small meeting rooms. It is also the first time in 15 years that all research groups of the institute are located in one common building.

See also 
 Erich Rieger

External links 
 http://www.mpe.mpg.de
 https://web.archive.org/web/20120609132517/http://www.mpia.de/Public/menu-e.php
 http://www.nasa.gov/
 http://www.esa.int/esaCP/index.html

References 

Extraterrestrial Physics
Education in Munich
Astronomy institutes and departments
Physics institutes
Garching bei München